Mirzaali Khan (also Romanized as Mīrzā‘alī Khān; also known as Mīrzā‘alī) is a village in Hoseynabad Rural District, in the Central District of Shush County, Khuzestan Province, Iran. At the 2006 census, its population was 417, in 65 families.

References 

Populated places in Shush County